Vandellòs I nuclear accident was a fire that caused an interruption of the cooling system in the Vandellòs Nuclear Power Plant, Catalonia (Spain) on 19 October 1989.

At the end of Francoist Spain, France sold Spain a UNGG reactor. This already obsolete energy technology was installed because as a by-product it provided plutonium that could be used to manufacture atomic bombs. Vandellòs I Nuclear Power Plant was inaugurated in 1972 when there were only two operational nuclear power plants in Spain: Garoña and Zorita. Seventeen years after opening, the rudimentary technology produced a mechanical failure in the steam turbine which caused a fire. The cabling of the plant was not fireproof, and the control computer and the cooling system would also receive damage.

A core meltdown was avoided due to the intervention of the Corps of Firefighters of Catalonia and the plant technicians, who were able to extinguish the fire and turn off the nuclear reactor manually. It continues to be one of the most significant nuclear accidents in Western Europe, classified as a serious incident according to the International Nuclear Event Scale. Consequently, the plant would be decommissioned, due to the damage in the systems, and new safety protocols were introduced because the old ones proved to be insufficient.

See also 
 Goiânia accident
 Three Mile Island accident
 Windscale fire

References

External links 
 Youtube video: 25 years since the nuclear accident of Vandellòs I 

Civilian nuclear power accidents
Fires in Spain
Nuclear accidents and incidents
Nuclear power stations in Catalonia
1989 in Spain
1989 disasters in Spain